Love Me Forever (also released as On Wings of Song) is a 1935 American drama film directed by Victor Schertzinger. The film was nominated for an Academy Award for  Best Sound Recording (John P. Livadary).

Cast
 Grace Moore as Margaret Howard
 Leo Carrillo as Steve Corelli
 Robert Allen as Phillip Cameron
 Spring Byington as Clara Fields
 Michael Bartlett as Michael Bartlett
 Luis Alberni as Luigi
 Douglass Dumbrille as Miller
 Thurston Hall as Maurizio

Reception
Writing for The Spectator, Graham Greene made light of the film's use of excerpts from La Bohème and described Moore's acting as "undistinguished", suggesting that the success of the film is due in large part to Carrillo's performance.

It was the 10th most popular film at the British box office in 1935-36.

References

External links
 

1935 films
1935 drama films
American drama films
American black-and-white films
Columbia Pictures films
Films directed by Victor Schertzinger
Films with screenplays by Jo Swerling
1930s English-language films
1930s American films